Fitna (or , pl. ; : "temptation, trial; sedition, civil strife, conflict") is an Arabic word with extensive connotations of trial, affliction, or distress. Although it is a word with important historical implications, it is also widely used in modern Arabic without the underlying historical connotations.

Due to the conceptual importance of fitna in the Qur'an, its use in that work may need to be considered separately from, though in addition to, the word's general lexical meaning in Classical Arabic.

Aside from its use in the Qur'an, fitna is used as term for the four heavy civil wars within the Islamic Caliphate from the 7th to the 9th century AD.

Root and forms
Arabic, in common with other Semitic languages like Hebrew, employs a system of root letters combined with vowel patterns to constitute its whole range of vocabulary. As such, identification of the root letters of any word might bring a better understanding the word's full semantic range.

Fitna has the triliteral root fā'-tā'-nūn. In addition to the feminine noun fitna, fitan, this root forms, in particular, a Form I active verb fatana, yaftinu, a Form I passive verb futina, yuftanu, a Form I maṣdar futūn, a Form I active participle fātin, a Form I passive participle  maftūn, and so on.

Lexical meanings

Classical Arabic
Edward William Lane, in his Arabic-English Lexicon compiled from various traditional Arabic lexicographical sources available in Cairo in the mid-19th-century, reported that "to burn" is the "primary signification" of the verb. The verb then came to be applied to the smelting of gold and silver. It was extended to mean causing one to enter into fire and into a state of punishment or affliction. Thus, one says that something caused one to enter al-fitna, i.e. trial, affliction, etc., or more generally, an affliction whereby some good or evil quality is put to the test. Lane glosses the noun fitna as meaning a trial, a probation, affliction, distress or hardship, and says that "the sum total of its meaning in the language of the Arabs" is an affliction whereby one is tried, proved or tested.

The definitions offered by Lane match those suggested by Badawi and Haleem in their dictionary of Qur'anic usage. They gloss the triliteral root as having the following meanings: "to purify gold and silver by smelting them; to burn; to put to the test, to afflict (in particular as a means of testing someone's endurance); to disrupt the peace of a community; to tempt, to seduce, to allure, to infatuate."

Modern Standard Arabic
The meanings of fitna as found in Classical Arabic largely carry over into Modern Standard Arabic, as evidenced by the recitation of the same set of meanings in Hans Wehr's Dictionary of Modern Written Arabic. In addition, Wehr glosses the noun fitna as also meaning "charm, charmingness, attractiveness; enchantment, captivation, fascination, enticement, temptation; infatuation, intrigue; sedition, riot, discord, dissension, civil strife."

Buckwalter & Parkinson, in their frequency dictionary of Arabic, list the noun fitna as the 1,560th most frequent word in their corpus of over 30 million words from Modern Standard Arabic and colloquial Arabic dialects. They gloss fitna as meaning "charm, allure, enchantment; unrest; riot, rebellion."

Nakhla Raid (first mention of Fitna in Quran)

The first Quran verse about Fitna was supposedly revealed during the Nakhla Raid. After his return from the first Badr encounter (Battle of Safwan), Muhammad sent Abdullah ibn Jahsh in Rajab with 12 men on a fact-finding operation.  Abdullah ibn Jahsh was a maternal cousin of Muhammad. He took along with him Abu Haudhayfa, Abdullah ibn Jahsh, Ukkash ibn Mihsan, Utba b. Ghazwan, Sa'd ibn Abi Waqqas, Amir ibn Rabia, Waqid ibn Abdullah and Khalid ibn al-Bukayr.
Muhammad gave Abdullah ibn Jahsh a letter, but not to be read until he had traveled for two days and then to do what he was instructed to do in the letter without putting pressure on his companions. Abdullah proceeded for two days, then he opened the letter; it told him to proceed until he reached Nakhla, between Mecca and Taif, to lie in wait for the Quraysh, and to observe what they were doing.

While the Quraysh were busy preparing food, the Muslims attacked. In the short battle that took place, Waqid ibn Abdullah killed Amr ibn Hadrami, the leader of the Quraysh caravan, with an arrow. The Muslims captured two Quraysh tribe members. Nawfal ibn Abdullah managed to escape. The Muslims took Uthman ibn Abdullah and al-Hakam ibn Kaysan as captives. Abdullah ibn Jahsh returned to Medina with the booty and with the two captured Quraysh tribe members. The followers planned to give one-fifth of the booty to Muhammad.

Mention in the Quran
Muhammad initially disapproved of that act and suspended any action as regards the camels and the two captives on account of the prohibited months. The Arab pagans exploited this opportunity to accuse the Muslims  of violating what is divinely inviolable (fighting in the months considered sacred to the Arab pagans). This idle talk brought about a painful headache for Muhammad's Companions, until at last they were relieved when Muhammad revealed a verse regarding fighting in the sacred months

According to Ibn Qayyim, he said "most of the scholars have explained the word Fitnah here as meaning Shirk"

The Muslim Mufassir Ibn Kathir's commentary on this verse in his book Tafsir ibn Kathir is as follows:
means, trying to force the Muslims to revert from their religion and re-embrace Kufr after they had believed, is worse with Allah than killing.' Allah said:

In Qur'an

Statistics
Badawi & Haleem note that the triliteral root fā'-tā'-nūn occurs in 6 different forms a total of 60 times in the Qur'an. In particular, it appears 34 times as a noun and 26 times in various verbal forms. Bakhtiar's concordance of the Qur'an confirms Badawi & Haleem's numbers, although Bakhtiar further breaks down the appearance of each verbal form by distinguishing active and passive verbs by tense as well. The following table sets out the details; note that since the root only appears as a verb in Form I forms, that is assumed.

Semantics
The triliteral root fā'-tā'-nūn, as noted above, bears a range of significations, even in the Qur'an itself. The Qur'anic appearances of the root are explored below (in no particular order).

Persecution
Fitna as persecution appears in several of the verses commanding Muslims to fight the unbelievers (specifically referring to the Meccan polytheists who had persecuted Muhammad and his early followers, thus leading to the hijra).

Dissension/sedition
A set of occurrences of the root related to dissension or sedition occurs in Quran , where those who say they are believers, but show themselves reluctant to follow certain of God's commands, are described as seeking "sedition" among the community.

Trial
Many instances of the root as "trial" appear throughout the Qur'an.

However, the root in other verses carries a sense of "trial" as simply a kind of test of a person's commitment to their faith (without necessarily implying that the testing results from something bad happening, as the sense of trial as "tribulation" might bear). For example, Qur'an  says, in part, "And even so do We try some of them by others." Qur'an  also carries this sense of trial by something good; there, God's own "boon" (or "blessing") is described as a trial for certain people.

Trials may also result from things revealed by God that some may find difficult to accept. For example, Qur'an  describes the revelation of the "Cursed Tree" as "an ordeal for mankind."

Temptation

Historical usage

Aside from its use in the Qur'an, fitna came to have a primary sense of "'revolt', 'disturbances', 'civil war', but a civil war that breeds schism and in which the believers' purity of faith is in grave danger." This was especially so as it came, in the term First Fitna, to refer to the first major civil war of the Islamic Caliphate, which lasted from 656 to 661. "On account of the struggles that marked Mu'āwiya's advent, the term fitna was later applied to any period of disturbances inspired by schools or sects that broke away from the majority of believers." The term thus appears the descriptions of other major conflicts such as the Second Fitna (680–92), the Third Fitna (744–47), the Fourth Fitna (809-827), and the Fitna of al-Andalus (1009–1031).

See also
 Arab Winter
 Temptation
 Fitnat al-Wahhabiyya

Notes

References

 Soravia, Bruna, "Fitna", in Muhammad in History, Thought, and Culture: An Encyclopedia of the Prophet of God (2 vols.), Edited by C. Fitzpatrick and A. Walker, Santa Barbara, ABC-CLIO, 2014, Vol I, pp. 209–211.

Islamic eschatology
Arabic words and phrases
Islamic terminology
Arabic words and phrases in Sharia
Sharia legal terminology
Polysemy

be:Фітна, слова
id:Fitnah